Before I Forget may refer to:
 Before I Forget (album), a 1982 album recorded by Jon Lord
 Before I Forget (film), a 2007 film by Jacques Nolot
 "Before I Forget" (song), a 2004 song by Slipknot
 "Before I Forget" (Eureka episode), a season 1 episode of the sci-fi television series Eureka